EUCD may refer to:

 European Union Copyright Directive, one of the intellectual property directives of the European Union, especially the Information Society Directive
 European Union of Christian Democrats, a predecessor of the current European People's Party
 Ford EUCD platform, a midsize car automobile platform launched in 2006